Morgan Andrew Williams (born April 17, 1976 in Kingston, Ontario) is a rugby union scrum half.

A Cole Harbour, Nova Scotia native, Williams debuted on the world rugby scene at age 23 when he scored two tries for Canada against France during the 1999 Rugby World Cup.

The 183 cm, 84 kg Williams has played professionally with Bordeaux-Begles (1999–00 season), Stade Français (00-02 and 06 seasons), Saracens (02-05 seasons).  Williams beat out Christophe Lassuque to gain the starting role at Stade Français, and Kieran Bracken at Saracens. Williams Played 3 times for the British Barbarians, and was selected in the Martin Johnston vs Joan Lomu North vs South game in Twickenham.

Williams has scored 12 tries and 1 drop-goal for Canada in 56 caps. He has participated in three world cups (1999, 2003, and 2007). He has also played a number of times for Canada in rugby sevens, most notably at the 2001 & 2005 Rugby World Cup Sevens and 2002 & 2006 Commonwealth Games. In 2005 against Argentina he captained Canada's fifteens for the first time in his career. After the 2007 World Cup he retired from international rugby.

Morgan Williams was announced as the head coach of the Canadian rugby sevens team in 2009 where he led the team to a top 8 world ranking. Williams also coached Canada Men's 7s to a 3rd-place finish in the Work Games in Cali, Colombia.

In 2012 Williams joined Women's Sevens head coach John Tait as the skills coach for the Women's National Sevens Team, who Finished 2nd in the 7s World Cup and 3rd in the first ever Olympics in Rugby Sevens history. In 2016 Williams was announced as the Assistant coach of the team. Currently Williams has helped the Olympic Bronze medalist finish 1st in Sydney, Australia, 3rd in Las Vegas, USA, 2nd in Kitakushu, Japan, and 2nd in Langford, Canada. In 2019, Williams led Canada to a gold medal at the Pan American games in Lima.

References

1976 births
Living people
Canadian rugby union coaches
Canadian rugby union players
Canadian people of Welsh descent
Sportspeople from Kingston, Ontario
Sportspeople from Halifax, Nova Scotia
People from Cole Harbour, Nova Scotia
Saracens F.C. players
Stade Français players
Canada international rugby union players
Canadian expatriate rugby union players
Expatriate rugby union players in England
Expatriate rugby union players in France
Canadian expatriate sportspeople in England
Canadian expatriate sportspeople in France
Canada international rugby sevens players
Male rugby sevens players
Commonwealth Games rugby sevens players of Canada
Rugby sevens players at the 2006 Commonwealth Games
SC Albi players
CA Bordeaux-Bègles Gironde players